María del Pilar Ayuso González (born 16 June 1942 in Badajoz) who served as a Spanish politician and Member of the European Parliament with the People's Party, part of the European People's Party.

Education
 1965: Agricultural engineer
 1970: PhD in Agricultural Engineering
 Diploma in European Community studies

Early career
 Researcher, Director of agrarian research projects at the National Agrarian Research Institute in Madrid
 1996-1999: Director-General for Food Policy and Agri-food Industries, Ministry of Agriculture

Political career

Career in national politics
 1981-1984: Secretary of the PP National Committee on Agricultural Studies
 1991-1996: Member of the Castile-La Mancha Regional Parliament for Ciudad Real
 Member of the National Executive Committee of the People's Party
 Member of the Executive Committee of the PP for Castile-La Mancha
 Member of the Ciudad Real Provincial Executive Committee of the PP
 Member of the European Union of Women and Vice-Chairwoman of the Association of Women for Democracy

Member of the European Parliament, 1999–2019
Ayuso joined the European Parliament in the 1999 European elections. Throughout her time in parliament, she served on the Committee on the Environment, Public Health and Food Safety. In this capacity, she was her parliamentary group's rapporteur on the fuel quality directive (FQD) in 2007. She was also a substitute for the Committee on Agriculture and Rural Development and the Committee on Industry, Research and Energy. In 2018, she joined the temporary Special Committee on the Union's authorisation procedure for pesticides.

In addition to her committee assignments, Ayuso was a member of the Delegation for relations with Mercosur and of the European Parliament Intergroup on Children's Rights.

Political positions
In September 2018 Gonzalez voted against the European Union triggering article 7 procedure against Hungary, due to the country's government posing a “systematic threat” to democracy and the rule of law.

Recognition
 Civil Order of Agricultural Merit

See also
 2004 European Parliament election in Spain

References

External links
 
 

1942 births
Living people
People's Party (Spain) MEPs
MEPs for Spain 1999–2004
MEPs for Spain 2004–2009
MEPs for Spain 2009–2014
MEPs for Spain 2014–2019
20th-century women MEPs for Spain
21st-century women MEPs for Spain
Members of the 3rd Cortes of Castilla–La Mancha
Members of the 4th Cortes of Castilla–La Mancha
Members of the Cortes of Castilla–La Mancha from Ciudad Real